Lemon meringue pie is a dessert pie consisting of a shortened pastry base filled with lemon curd and topped with meringue.

History 

Fruit desserts covered with baked meringue were found beginning in the 18th century in France. Menon's pommes meringuées are a sort of thick apple sauce or apple butter covered with baked meringue in his 1739 cookbook. A custard flavored with "citron" (probably a mistranslation of  'lemon') and covered with baked meringue, crême meringuée, was published by 1769 in English, apparently a translation of an earlier edition of Menon (1755?). Similar recipes cooked in a crust appear in 19th century America: apple pie covered with meringue, called 'apple a la turque' (1832) and 'apples meringuées' (1846). A generic 'meringue pie' based on any pie was documented in 1860. The name 'Lemon Meringue Pie' appears in 1869, but lemon custard pies with meringue topping were often simply called lemon cream pie. In literature one of the first references to this dessert can be found in the book 'Memoir and Letters of Jenny C. White Del Bal' by Rhoda E. White, published in 1868.

Preparation
A stiff lemon-flavored custard is prepared with egg yolks, lemon zest and juice, sugar, and sometimes starch and baked in a pie crust. Uncooked meringue, usually shaped into peaks, is spread over the top, sometimes with a sprinkle of sugar, and briefly baked.

See also

 Key lime pie
 List of lemon dishes and beverages

References

External links

 Lemon meringue pie @ The Food Timeline

Fruit pies
Lemon dishes
Meringue desserts
French desserts
American desserts